Events in the year 1964 in Belgium.

Incumbents
Monarch: Baudouin
Prime Minister: Théo Lefèvre

Events
 11 May – Front Démocratique des Francophones political party founded.
 11 October – Municipal elections
 27 October – Hostage crisis begins in Stanleyville, Republic of the Congo.
 24 November – Operation Dragon Rouge ends hostage crisis in Stanleyville.

Art and architecture
 René Magritte, Le fils de l'homme

Births
 4 February – Steven Vanackere, politician
 26 March – Godelieve Jansens, cyclist
 17 April
 Sonja Vermeylen, cyclist
 Bart Van den Bossche, entertainer (died 2013)
 4 May – Peter Roes, cyclist
 12 May – Bart Somers, politician
 18 May – Luc Suplis, judoka
 9 June – Bart Moeyaert, writer
 14 June – Pieter Timmermans, businessman
 21 June – Claude Verspaille, footballer
 26 July – Anne Provoost, writer
 2 October – Hilde Quintens, cyclist
 31 October – Dimitri Mbuyu, footballer
 8 November – Dominique Leroy, businesswoman

Deaths
 7 January – Jean Verbrugge (born 1896), orthopedic surgeon
 26 February – Léon Vanderstuyft (born 1890), cyclist
 29 February – Victor van Straelen (born 1889), conservationist
 27 March – Roger Motz (born 1904), politician
 21 June – Jan Mertens (born 1904), cyclist
 27 June – Georges Brausch (born 1915), ethnographer
 13 July – Achille Delattre (born 1879), trade unionist
 30 July – Alfred Verdyck (born 1882), footballer
 2 September – Henri Hanlet (born 1888), cyclist
 17 September – Jean Ray (born 1887), writer
 5 October – Jean-Baptiste Janssens (born 1889), Jesuit
 16 November – Lucien Dehoux (born 1890), gymnast
 7 December – Aloïs Simon (born 1897), historian

References

 
1960s in Belgium
Belgium
Years of the 20th century in Belgium
Belgium